Senator Engel may refer to:

Albert J. Engel (1888–1959), Michigan State Senate
L. Patrick Engel (born 1932), Nebraska State Senate

See also
Clair Engle (1911–1964), U.S. Senator from California from 1959 to 1964